Pravdino is the name of several rural localities in Russia:
Pravdino, Guryevsky District, Kaliningrad Oblast, a settlement in Khrabrovsky Rural Okrug of Guryevsky District in Kaliningrad Oblast
Pravdino, Krasnoznamensky District, Kaliningrad Oblast, a settlement in Dobrovolsky Rural Okrug of Krasnoznamensky District in Kaliningrad Oblast
Pravdino, Krasnoselskoye Settlement Municipal Formation, Vyborgsky District, Leningrad Oblast, a settlement in Krasnoselskoye Settlement Municipal Formation of Vyborgsky District in Leningrad Oblast; 
Pravdino, Svetogorskoye Settlement Municipal Formation, Vyborgsky District, Leningrad Oblast, a settlement under the administrative jurisdiction of Svetogorskoye Settlement Municipal Formation in Vyborgsky District of Leningrad Oblast; 
Pravdino (selo), Yaroslavl Oblast, a selo in Nekouzsky Rural Okrug of Nekouzsky District in Yaroslavl Oblast
Pravdino (village), Yaroslavl Oblast, a village in Nekouzsky Rural Okrug of Nekouzsky District in Yaroslavl Oblast